Fisher Township is one of thirteen townships in Fremont County, Iowa, United States.  As of the 2010 census, its population was 698 and it contained 341 housing units.

History
Fisher Township was named for Edward Fisher, a pioneer settler.

Geography

Cities, towns, villages
 Farragut (vast majority)
 Shenandoah (west quarter)

Cemeteries
The township contains Farragut Cemetery and Manti Cemetery.

Transportation
 Iowa Highway 2
 U.S. Route 59

School districts
 Farragut Community School District
 Shenandoah Community School District

Political districts
 Iowa's 3rd congressional district
 State House District 23
 State Senate District 12

References

External links
 City-Data.com

Townships in Iowa
Townships in Fremont County, Iowa